Josselin Henry (born 22 April 1982 in Nancy) is a French sport shooter. Henry represented France at the 2008 Summer Olympics in Beijing, where he competed for all three rifle shooting events.

In his first event, 10 m air rifle, Henry was able to hit a total of 587 points within six attempts, finishing fortieth in the qualifying rounds. Few days later, he placed twenty-third in the 50 m rifle prone, by one target behind Israel's Gil Simkovitch from the final attempt, with a total score of 592 points. In his third and last event, 50 m rifle 3 positions, Henry was able to shoot 388 targets in a prone position, 373 in standing, and 390 in kneeling, for a total score of 1,151 points, finishing only in forty-first place.

References

External links
Profile – French Olympic Committee 
NBC 2008 Olympics profile

French male sport shooters
Living people
Olympic shooters of France
Shooters at the 2008 Summer Olympics
Sportspeople from Nancy, France
1982 births